Cider doughnuts are a harvest tradition in autumn in the northeastern United States and are sometimes sold at cider mills. They are often paired with apple cider, and may be covered with cinnamon and/or granulated sugar. They are "cake doughnuts" and get their flavor from cinnamon, nutmeg and apple cider used in the batter.

Gallery

See also
 List of regional dishes of the United States
 List of doughnut varieties
List of fried dough varieties 
 List of breakfast foods

References

Further reading

External links

Delicious Dishings – Apple Cider Doughnuts (recipe, instructions, & photographs)
Instructables – Apple Cider Doughnuts (recipe, instructions, & photographs)

Cuisine of the Northeastern United States
American doughnuts